The Honor 20 is a smartphone made by Huawei under their Honor sub-brand. It is a successor of the Huawei Honor 10 within the Huawei Honor series.

It was unveiled in London on May 21.

It became available in the United Kingdom on June 21 and in India on June 25, 2019. It retails for £400 in the UK or €499 in Europe. Colors provided are midnight black, sapphire blue and Icelandic white.

Specifications

Hardware
The Honor 20 has a HiSilicon Kirin 980 octa-core processor, a Mali-G76 MP10 GPU, and a 3,750 mAh non-removable battery. It has a 6.26-inch “all-view” display LCD screen.

The phone has four rear cameras including a 48-megapixel main camera, a 16-megapixel super-wide-angle camera, a 2-megapixel depth camera and a 2-megapixel macro camera.

The HONOR 20 shares many core similarities with the Pro version – using the same SoC, for example – but with less onboard RAM at 6GB and only 128GB of native storage. Another difference is that the rear quad camera's 8-megapixel telephoto unit has been exchanged with a 2-megapixel depth assisting unit. The device features the same display and front camera as the Pro version, but the battery capacity is slightly less at 3,750mAh, though it uses the same charger as the Pro version.

The HONOR 20 comes in Phantom Blue or Phantom Black for the global market, Icelandic White for the China market, and is priced at €499.

Software
The Honor 20 launched with Android Pie (version 9.0) and EMUI 9.0.

Reception
On June 18, Honor 20 reached 1 million sales in China.

References

External links
 
 Honor 20 - Full phone specifications

Mobile phones introduced in 2019
Android (operating system) devices
Huawei Honor
Mobile phones with multiple rear cameras
Mobile phones with 4K video recording
Discontinued smartphones